The Phoenix Pharmacy is a historic building at the intersection of Foster Road and 67th Avenue in southeast Portland, Oregon. Built in 1922, the structure is slated for renovation, as of 2019.  It was listed on the National Register of Historic Places in 2022.

See also
National Register of Historic Places listings in Southeast Portland, Oregon

References

1922 establishments in Oregon
Buildings and structures completed in 1922
Buildings and structures in Portland, Oregon
Foster-Powell, Portland, Oregon
National Register of Historic Places in Portland, Oregon
Pharmacies on the National Register of Historic Places